HMS Pyramus was a fifth-rate 36-gun frigate launched at Portsmouth in 1810. During the Napoleonic Wars she captured some small privateers. She was hulked in 1832–1833 at Halifax, Nova Scotia. The vessel was sold and broken up in 1879.

Origin
She was ordered in 1805 and laid down the next year, but in 1807 the builder failed. The Admiralty transferred the frame to the Portsmouth Dockyard. The Admiralty reordered her and she was launched in 1810.

The information that Lord Nelson had captured Pyramus at the Battle of Copenhagen in 1801 is incorrect. (Source Dr. Ian A. Cameron, M.D, F.C.F.P., Nova Scotia Medical Bulletin, August 1987, pp. 118–120; Also, the Cambridge Digital Library / University of Cambridge website)

Career
On 26 October 1813,  and Pyramus captured the 225 ton (bm) American letter of marque Chesapeake off Nantes. Captain Joseph Richardson had sailed her from America to France and she left Nantes on 18 October 1813.

On 29 November Pyramus captured the American vessel , Jedediah Olcott, master, of four guns and 20 men. Zephyr had been sailing from Lorient to Charlestown.

Fate
Pyramus was laid up in 1829. Between November 1832 and July 1833 she underwent fitting for a convict and receiving ship for Halifax, Nova Scotia. From 1834 to 1875 she was at Halifax. She served as a hospital ship during the Chorea Epidemic.

On 10 November 1879 she was sold for £1,600 for breaking up.

Notes

Citations

References
 
 
 

1810 ships
Brigs of the Royal Navy
Hospital ships of the United Kingdom
Military medical installations